Cycas chenii is a species of cycad endemic to the Red River valley of Yunnan, southern China. It is found in Honghe County and Shuangbai County, Yunnan. It is most closely related to Cycas guizhouensis.

Distribution
Cycas chenii has been recorded in the following townships (Zhou, et al. 2015).

Dutian (独田乡), Shuangbai County (type locality)
Lianhua (莲花), Honghe County
Menglong (勐龙河), Honghe County
Qingshuihe (清水河), Shuangbai County

References

 Wei Zhou, Meng-Meng Guan and Xun Gong. 2015. Cycas chenii (Cycadaceae), A New Species from China, and its Phylogenetic Position. Journal of Systematics and Evolution. 53(6); 489–498. DOI: 10.1111/jse.12153

chenii
Flora of Yunnan
Plants described in 2015